Muhammad Faizzzwan bin Dorahim (born 10 October 1995) is a Malaysian footballer who plays as a defender for Malaysian Super League club PKNP.

References

External links
 

Living people
People from Perak
Malaysian footballers
Malaysia Super League players
Perak F.C. players
PKNP FC players
Association football defenders
1995 births